Kedra Holland-Corn (born November 5, 1974) is an American professional women's basketball player with the Detroit Shock of the Women's National Basketball Association (WNBA). After attending the University of Georgia, she played for the Sacramento Monarchs and Houston Comets.

She also played in Hungary and Italy. In Italy, with La Spezia team, won the Italian league's MVP title in the 2005–06 season. In the next season Kedra will play again in Italy with Phard Napoli.

History 
Professional Experience:

2019 –
Coach Girls' Basketball

2013 – 2017
Personal Fitness Trainer - At Aramco

2006 – 2008
Professional Basketball Player in Napoli Italy	

Summer 2007
Coach for NBC Basketball Camp Italy

Fall/winter 2005 – 2006
Professional Basketball Player in La Spezia Italy

Fall/winter 2004 – 2005
Professional Basketball Player in Budapest Hungary 	

Summer 2004
Professional Basketball Player for the WNBA's Houston Comets

Fall/winter 2003 – 2004
Professional Basketball Player in Valencia Spain	

Summer 2003
Professional Basketball Player for the WNBA’s Detroit Shock			

All summers 1999 – 2002
Professional Basketball Player for the WNBA’s Sacramento Monarchs 	

Fall/winter 2002 – 2003
Professional Basketball Player in Spain for Barcelona Club Team 	

Fall/winter 2001 – 2002
Professional Basketball Player in France for Aix-en-Provence Club Team 	

Fall/winter 2000 – 2001
Professional Basketball Player in Spain for Lugo Club Team

Fall/winter 1999 – 2000
Professional Basketball Player in Italy for Faenza Club Team

Fall/winter - 1997 – 1998
ABL San Jose Lasers - American Basketball League
WNBA Champions (Detroit Shock) (2003)
Spanish League Champion in Barcelona Spain (2003)
Spanish League Champion in Valencia Spain (2004)
WNBA Champions (Detroit Shock) (2006)
Italian League Champion in Napoli Italy (2006)
Euroleague All-Star (2008)
Italian league player of the year (200

Georgia statistics
Source

USA Basketball
Holland-Corn represented the US at the 1997 World University Games held in Marsala, Sicily, Italy in August 1997. The USA team won all six games, earning the gold medal at the event.  Holland-Corn went on to average 10.3 points per game, and led her team with 15 steals.

References

External links
WNBA bio

1974 births
Living people
All-American college women's basketball players
American women's basketball players
Basketball players from Houston
Detroit Shock players
Georgia Lady Bulldogs basketball players
Houston Comets players
Parade High School All-Americans (girls' basketball)
Sacramento Monarchs players
San Jose Lasers players
Shooting guards
Universiade gold medalists for the United States
Universiade medalists in basketball
United States women's national basketball team players